Caeneressa is a genus of moths in the family Erebidae.

Species
Caeneressa albifrons (Moore, 1878)
Caeneressa alikangiensis (Strand, 1915)
Caeneressa annosa (Walker, 1859)
Caeneressa brithyris (Druce, 1898)
Caeneressa diaphana (Kollar, 1848)
Caeneressa dispar Obraztsov, 1957
Caeneressa everetti (Rothschild, 1910)
Caeneressa fouqueti (de Joannis, 1912)
Caeneressa graduata (Hampson, 1898)
Caeneressa hoenei Obraztsov, 1957
Caeneressa klapperichi Obraztsov, 1957
Caeneressa leucozona (Hampson, 1911)
Caeneressa longipennis (Walker, 1862)
Caeneressa lutosa (Holloway, 1976)
Caeneressa marcescoides Holloway, 1988
Caeneressa newara (Moore, 1879)
Caeneressa ningyuena Obraztsov, 1957
Caeneressa obsoleta (Leech, 1898)
Caeneressa oenone (Butler, 1876)
Caeneressa robusta (Holloway, 1976)
Caeneressa pratti (Leech, 1889)
Caeneressa proxima Obraztsov, 1957
Caeneressa rubrozonata (Poujade, 1886)
Caeneressa serrata (Hampson, [1893])
Caeneressa sexpuncta (Rothschild, 1912)
Caeneressa syntomoides (Rothschild, 1912)
Caeneressa swinhoei (Leech, 1898)
Caeneressa tienmushana Obraztsov, 1957
Caeneressa zernyi Obraztsov, 1957

References

External links

Syntomini
Moth genera